Knape is a small settlement in the Municipality of Škofja Loka in the Upper Carniola region of Slovenia.

Name
The name Knape is derived from the Slovene noun knap 'miner', a borrowing from Old High German knappe 'boy, squire, servant'. Iron ore was formerly mined in the Jablenovica Valley east of the village.

References

External links

Knape at Geopedia

Populated places in the Municipality of Škofja Loka